Vernon Sankey is an Independent Director and Chairman of Audit Committee, Atos SE  and a previous Chairman of Firmenich SA, Switzerland.

In the period 1992 - 1999 Sankey was the CEO of Reckitt and Colman plc. He has also held positions as Chairman of Thomson Travel Group plc in 2000, Gala Group plc (2000 - 2003), deputy Chairman of Beltpacker plc (2000 - 2005), Non-Executive Director of Pearson plc (1993 - 2006), Chairman of Photo-Me International plc  (2000 - 2007), non-executive Director of Zurich Insurance AG (1998 - 2012) and Chairman of its Remuneration Committee) He was a founder board member of the UK's Food Standards Agency (2000 - 2005) and a Non- Executive Director of Cofra Holding AG (2001 - 2007)

In 2000 Sankey set up an executive coaching company called REDCO Ltd of which he was Chairman. He has extensive experience in advising and coaching companies and executives on personal and corporate change and lectures on Leadership and Transformation Management. In 2018 he published a book called The Stairway to Happiness, which combines philosophy, cognitive psychology and spirituality and represents many years of coaching and mentoring people in all walks of life. A second book, co-authored with Ms. Katey Lockwood, and called The Way: Finding Peace in Turbulent Times, was published in November 2019. A third book: The Way Workbook, co-authored with Ms. Katey Lockwood was published in August 2021. A fourth book: Toxicum: Managing Toxic People, also Co-authored with Ms.Katey Lockwood was published in November 2023 

Sankey was also a Governor of Harrow School and a Trustee (Royal Charter) of the John Lyon Charity (2001 - 2016)

Mr Sankey went to university at Oriel College, Oxford University. He is a Fellow of the Royal Society of Arts and was a Trustee of the Royal Charter.

Mr Sankey is married to Elizabeth. They have 4 children and 8 grandchildren. A former black belt in Tae Kwon Do, leisure interests include rowing, weight training and yoga

References

Living people
British businesspeople
Year of birth missing (living people)